The following highways are numbered 153:

Brazil
 BR-153

Canada
 Prince Edward Island Route 153 (Greenmount Road)
  Quebec Route 153

Costa Rica
 National Route 153

India
 National Highway 153 (India)

Japan
 Japan National Route 153

Korea, South
 Pyeongtaek–Siheung Expressway

United Kingdom
A153

United States
 Alabama State Route 153
 Arizona State Route 153 (former)
 Arkansas Highway 153
 California State Route 153
 Connecticut Route 153
 Georgia State Route 153
 Illinois Route 153
 K-153 (Kansas highway)
 Kentucky Route 153
 Louisiana Highway 153
 Maine State Route 153
 M-153 (Michigan highway)
 Missouri Route 153
Nevada State Route 153 (former)
 New Hampshire Route 153
 New Jersey Route 153 (former)
 New Mexico State Road 153
 New York State Route 153
 North Carolina Highway 153
 Ohio State Route 153
 Oklahoma State Highway 153
 Oregon Route 153
 Pennsylvania Route 153
 South Carolina Highway 153
 South Dakota Highway 153
 Tennessee State Route 153
 Texas State Highway 153
 Utah State Route 153
 Vermont Route 153
 Virginia State Route 153
 Washington State Route 153
 Wisconsin Highway 153
 Wyoming Highway 153
Territories
 Puerto Rico Highway 153